The year 1943 in architecture involved some significant architectural events and new buildings.

Events
 The Athens Charter is published by the Congres Internationaux d'Architecture Moderne group of architects.
 Nikolaus Pevsner's book An Outline of European Architecture is published in Britain.
 The County of London Plan is prepared by J. H. Forshaw and Patrick Abercrombie.

Buildings and structures

Buildings opened
 January 15 – The Pentagon in Washington, D.C., United States, designed by George Bergstrom
 April 13 – The Jefferson Memorial in Washington D.C., designed by John Russell Pope
 Peace River Suspension Bridge, Canada (collapsed 1957)
 Sandö Bridge, Sweden
 Surp Hagop Church, Aleppo, Syria
 Church of Saint Francis of Assisi, Pampulha, Belo Horizonte, Minas Gerais, Brazil, designed by Oscar Niemeyer
 Umaid Bhawan Palace, Jodhpur, India, designed by Henry Vaughan Lanchester (begun 1929)
 Block D, Bletchley Park, England.

Buildings completed
 Casa Malaparte on Capri, house for Curzio Malaparte designed by him with Adalberto Libera and builder Adolfo Amitrano (begun 1937)

Awards
 RIBA Royal Gold Medal – Charles Herbert Reilly.
 Grand Prix de Rome, architecture: André Chatelin and Jean Dubuisson.

Births
 January 3 – Sigrid Lorenzen Rupp, German-born architect (died 2004)
 March 14 – Peter Vetsch, Swiss architect
 April 1 – Mario Botta, Swiss architect
 April 24 – Franco Stella, Italian architect
 April 26 – Peter Zumthor, Swiss architect
 August 7 – Abdel-Wahed El-Wakil, Egyptian architect working in Islamic and New Classical styles

Deaths
 June 27 – Knud Arne Petersen, Danish architect and director of Tivoli Gardens, Copenhagen (born 1862)
 July 19 – Giuseppe Terragni, Italian Rationalist architect (born 1904; thrombosis)
 November 29 – John Virginius Bennes, Oregon architect (born 1867)

References